Hardesty is a town in Texas County, Oklahoma, United States. As of the 2010 census, the town population was 212.

History
The original Hardesty was four miles northeast of the present community.  It had a post office in 1887, with the name honoring A.J. “Jack” Hardesty, who had interests in the area.  However, the Rock Island railroad bypassed the town in 1901 and created the locale that became Guymon, Oklahoma.  Most of Hardesty’s residents and businesses relocated to Guymon, and the original town withered.

When a second Rock Island line later came through the county near the old Hardesty in 1929, a new community along the route was named Hardesty at the insistence of locals.  However, growth of the new Hardesty was stunted by the Great Depression and the Dust Bowl.  The town nevertheless incorporated in 1947 and remains in place, complete with a post office and a school district covering 250 square miles.

Geography
Hardesty is just south of the Coldwater Creek arm of the Optima Lake project, including Optima National Wildlife Refuge, and the Optima Wildlife Management Area public hunting lands managed by the Oklahoma Department of Wildlife Conservation. The town is approximately 18 miles southeast of Guymon along Oklahoma State Highway 3, which runs concurrently with U.S. Route 412 through Hardesty.

Demographics

As of the census of 2000, there were 277 people, 102 households, and 74 families residing in the town. There were 118 housing units at an average density of 523.1 per square mile (198.1/km2). The racial makeup of the town was 76.17% White, 1.44% Native American, 20.58% from other races, and 1.81% from two or more races. Hispanic or Latino of any race were 27.80% of the population.

There were 102 households, out of which 46.1% had children under the age of 18 living with them, 56.9% were married couples living together, 11.8% had a female householder with no husband present, and 26.5% were non-families. 23.5% of all households were made up of individuals, and 6.9% had someone living alone who was 65 years of age or older. The average household size was 2.72 and the average family size was 3.19.

In the town, the population was spread out, with 34.3% under the age of 18, 9.4% from 18 to 24, 31.4% from 25 to 44, 18.4% from 45 to 64, and 6.5% who were 65 years of age or older. The median age was 28 years. For every 100 females, there were 87.2 males. For every 100 females age 18 and over, there were 95.7 males.

The median income for a household in the town was $28,214, and the median income for a family was $29,688. Males had a median income of $26,667 versus $20,089 for females. The per capita income for the town was $11,836. About 24.2% of families and 22.5% of the population were below the poverty line, including 24.0% of those under the age of eighteen and 20.0% of those 65 or over.

Education
In 2007, a lawsuit  was brought against the local high school for religious discrimination and failure to separate church and state, after a student allegedly was kicked off the basketball team for refusing to participate in compulsory pre and post game prayers.   PACER shows the federal case, CIV-06-845-M, ended with that Stipulation of Dismissal with Prejudice filed October 29, 2008 and signed by all parties.

See also
 Hardesty Public School District

References

External links
 Encyclopedia of Oklahoma History and Culture - Hardesty

Towns in Texas County, Oklahoma
Towns in Oklahoma
Oklahoma Panhandle